Martin Gleeson (born 25 August 1994) is a professional Australian rules footballer, who played for the Essendon Football Club in the Australian Football League (AFL). His position on the field is half back.  He is the nephew of former  player Adrian Gleeson.

Early career

Gleeson played for the North Ballarat Rebels in the TAC Cup. Like his uncle Adrian, he played for Koroit as a junior.

AFL career

He made his AFL debut against  in round 1 of the 2014 AFL season. He became a regular in the senior side until a serious ankle injury kept him out for the entire 2018 season. He returned to the seniors in 2019 but struggled to kept his spot. Known as a popular clubman he was delisted at the end of the 2021 season.

Statistics
Statistics are correct to the end of 2021

|- style="background-color: #EAEAEA"
! scope="row" style="text-align:center" | 2014
|  || 35 || 9 || 2 || 4 || 71 || 42 || 113 || 37 || 15 || 0.2 || 0.4 || 7.9 || 4.7 || 12.6 || 4.1 || 1.7
|- 
! scope="row" style="text-align:center" | 2015
|  || 35 || 22 || 2 || 3 || 152 || 154 || 306 || 84 || 45 || 0.1 || 0.1 || 6.9 || 7.0 || 13.9 || 3.8 || 2.1
|- style="background-color: #EAEAEA"
! scope="row" style="text-align:center" | 2016
|  || 8 || 20 || 0 || 1 || 181 || 172 || 353 || 106 || 35 || 0.0 || 0.1 || 9.1 || 8.6 || 17.7 || 5.3 || 1.8
|- 
! scope="row" style="text-align:center" | 2017
|  || 8 || 18 || 1 || 0 || 196 || 100 || 296 || 106 || 32 || 0.1 || 0.0 || 10.9 || 5.6 || 16.4 || 5.9 || 1.8
|- style="background-color: #EAEAEA"
! scope="row" style="text-align:center" | 2018
|  || 8 || - || - || - || - || - || - || - || - || - || - || - || - || - || - || -
|-
! scope="row" style="text-align:center" | 2019
|  || 8 || 9 || 0 || 1 || 92 || 57 || 149 || 40 || 10 || 0.0 || 0.1 || 10.2 || 6.3 || 16.6 || 4.4 || 1.1
|- style="background-color: #EAEAEA"
! scope="row" style="text-align:center" | 2020
|  || 8 || 13 || 0 || 0 || 75 || 65 || 140 || 40 || 17 || 0.0 || 0.0 || 5.8 || 5.0 || 10.8 || 3.1 || 1.3
|-
! scope="row" style="text-align:center" | 2021
|  || 8 || 6 || 0 || 0 || 33 || 27 || 60 || 21 || 11 || 0.0 || 0.0 || 5.5 || 4.5 || 10.0 || 3.5 || 1.8
|- class="sortbottom"
! colspan=3| Career
! 97
! 5
! 9
! 800
! 527 
! 1327 
! 434
! 165 
! 0.1 
! 0.1 
! 8.4 
! 6.5 
! 14.9 
! 4.5
! 1.7
|}

References

External links

1994 births
Living people
Essendon Football Club players
Greater Western Victoria Rebels players
Australian rules footballers from Victoria (Australia)
People educated at St Patrick's College, Ballarat